The Freedom of access to information (2003/4/EC) is a European Union directive with the formal title "Directive 2003/4/EC of the European Parliament and of the Council of 28 January 2003 on public access to environmental information and repealing Council Directive 90/313/EEC".

The purpose of the Directive is to ensure that environmental information is systematically available and distributed to the public.  The Directive requires Member States to ensure that public authorities  are required to make the environmental information they hold available to any legal or natural person on request.

In 1998, the European Community signed a Convention on access to information, public participation in decision-making and access to justice in environmental matters (the Aarhus Convention). The Freedom of access to information Directive implements the Convention.

Exceptions

Public authorities are required to release information on request subject to the following exceptions:

the authority does not hold the requested information
the request is manifestly unreasonable;
the request is too general;
the requested information is in the course of completion;
the request concerns internal communications;
the disclosure of the information would adversely affect:
the confidentiality of the proceedings of public authorities or of commercial or industrial information;
public security or national defence;
the course of justice;
intellectual property rights;
the confidentiality of personal data;
the interests of the person who supplied the information on a voluntary basis; or
the protection of the environment.

Structure

Recital
Article 1 – Objectives
Article 2 – Definitions
Article 3 – Access to environmental information upon request
Article 4 – Exceptions
Article 5 – Charges
Article 6 – Access to justice
Article 7 – Dissemination of environmental information
Article 8 – Quality of environmental information
Article 9 – Review procedure
Article 10 – Implementation
Article 11 – Repeal
Article 12 – Entry into force
Article 13 – Addressees
Annex – Correlation table

Implementation

In the United Kingdom, the Directive has been implemented by the Environmental Information Regulations 2004. In the Republic of Ireland, the Directive has been implemented as the European Communities (Access to Information on the Environment) Regulations 2007.

See also

List of European Union directives

References

European Union directives
European Union and the environment
Environmental law in the European Union
2003 in law
2003 in the environment
2003 in the European Union